The National Emergency Management Agency is an Australian government executive agency to help those affected by natural disasters, including droughts, bushfires and floods. It is an agency of the Department of Home Affairs. The agency was formed on 1 September 2022 from the merger of the National Recovery and Resilience Agency and Emergency Management Australia.

The formation of the agency was first announced by the newly-elected Albanese government in July 2022. The agency was originally intended to be named the National Emergency Management, Resilience and Recovery Agency. The name was later simplified to its current name prior to the creation of the agency.

The agency leads Australia’s disaster and emergency management efforts by providing informed strategic oversight and guidance, and by being constantly connected with local communities. It funds programs and initiatives, works with communities, industry and NGOs, gives national leadership, and provides round-the-clock all-hazards monitoring and operational coordination.

The Minister for Emergency Management, currently Murray Watt, holds ministerial responsibility for the agency. The agency is headed by its Coordinator-General, currently Brendan Moon.

Preceding agencies

National Recovery and Resilience Agency 

The National Recovery and Resilience Agency (NRRA) was the executive agency to help those affected by natural disasters, including droughts, bushfires and floods. It was formed on 5 May 2021 from the merger of the National Bushfire Recovery Agency and the National Drought and North Queensland Flood Response and Recovery Agency, in response to the Royal Commission into National Natural Disaster Arrangements.

Emergency Management Australia

See also

 List of Australian government entities

References

Emergency management in Australia
Government agencies of Australia
2022 establishments in Australia